Wolfgang Kornberger is an Austrian bass clarinetist.

Kornberger studied at the Academy of Music and the Performing Arts in Vienna. He was a founding member of the Vienna Clarinet Connection, and has worked for them as an arranger since 1994. He was also a member of Trio Clarin from 1994, performing in the Schwetzingen Festival and the Rheingau Musik Festival. He holds a part-time lectureship at the University of Music and Performing Arts in Vienna. He has performed with the Vienna Philharmonic, the Wiener Staatsoper, the RSO Vienna and the Wiener Volksoper.

References

External links
 Franz Schubert Institute: Wolfgang Kornberger
Gleichweit

Year of birth missing (living people)
Living people
Austrian male musicians
Austrian clarinetists
University of Music and Performing Arts Vienna alumni
Players of the Vienna Philharmonic
21st-century clarinetists